Maurice Everett Webb (1880–1939) was an English architect of the early 20th century, who started his architectural career working for his famous architect father, Sir Aston Webb, the practice trading as Sir Aston Webb and Son for some years. He was the first chairman of the Building Centre in London.

Projects
 alterations to 54 Mount Street, London W1 (c.1919; today residence of Ambassador of Brazil)
 Stock Exchange War Memorial (1919–1921).
 Hertford war memorial (1921)
 Royal Air Force Club, London (1919–1922)
 Wesley House, Jesus Lane, Cambridge (1925–1930)
 Nonconformist chapel (The Sanctuary), Whiteley Village, Surrey (1925–26)
 Artillery House, Artillery Row, London SW1 (1930)
 Master's Lodge, Pembroke College, Cambridge (1932–1933; demolished in 1990s)
 Abbey flats, Abbey Road, London NW8
 The Guildhall, Kingston upon Thames, Surrey (1935)
 Bentalls department store, Kingston upon Thames (1935)
 The Grampians, residential apartment block, Shepherds Bush, London W6 (1935 – 1937)
 The Presidential Palace, Nicosia, Cyprus (1933–1937)

References 

1880 births
1939 deaths
20th-century English architects